The former Randall Memorial Building, also known as the Village Cafe, is a historic commercial building located at Blowing Rock, Watauga County, North Carolina.  It was built in 1907, and is a 1 1/2-story, weatherboarded cottage with steep gable roof. It has a one-story hip roofed wing.  It was built by the local Episcopal Church congregation to serve as a workshop and training center for mountain handicrafts.  It later served as a community centre.

It was listed on the National Register of Historic Places in 1991.

References

Commercial buildings on the National Register of Historic Places in North Carolina
Commercial buildings completed in 1907
Buildings and structures in Watauga County, North Carolina
National Register of Historic Places in Watauga County, North Carolina